Carex demissa is a species of sedge (genus Carex), native to Iceland, Macaronesia, all of Europe, and western Asia to the Himalayas and possibly Greenland. It has been introduced to eastern Canada, New Jersey, and Tasmania. It is a member of the Carex flava species complex.

Subtaxa
The following subspecies are currently accepted:
Carex demissa subsp. cedercreutzii (Fagerstr.) Jac.Koopman
Carex demissa subsp. demissa

References

demissa
Plants described in 1806